Toranosuke is a masculine Japanese given name.

Possible writings
Toranosuke can be written using many different combinations of kanji characters. Some examples:

虎之介, "tiger, of, mediate"
虎之助, "tiger, of, help"
虎之輔, "tiger, of, help"
虎之丞, "tiger, of, help"
寅之介, "sign of the tiger (Chinese zodiac), of, mediate"
寅之助, "sign of the tiger (Chinese zodiac), of, help"
寅之輔, "sign of the tiger (Chinese zodiac), of, help"
寅之丞, "sign of the tiger (Chinese zodiac), of, help"

The name can also be written in hiragana とらのすけ or katakana トラノスケ.

Notable people with the name
, Japanese politician.
, Japanese politician.
, childhood name of Nakagawa Kiyohide, Japanese daimyō.
, Japanese samurai.
, Japanese racing driver.
, Japanese politician.

Japanese masculine given names